Miss India Worldwide 2012 was the 21st edition of the international beauty pageant. The final was held in Paramaribo, Suriname on  February 25, 2012. About 35 countries were represented in the pageant. Alana Seebarran of Guyana was crowned as the winner at the end of the event.

Results

Special awards

Delegates

 – Olivia Rose
 – Natasha Adil Katrik
 – Tanha Dil
 – Shreeya Chawla
 – Christina Suthanthara
 – Wirasha Kasi
 – Leonie Singh Dhillon
 – Seetha Doulayram
 – Alana Seebarran
 – Eram Karim
 – Komal Udani
 – Ankita Arora
 – Shannell Brown
 – Anvita Sudarshan
 – Sharmisttha Yoogan
 – Sanjna Reinette
 – Uraysha Ramrachia
 – Charisma Dihal
 – Madhu Ramasubramanian
 – Veebha Sharma
 – Rameet Kaur
 – Sheha Idnani
 – Kavita Sonapal Kaur
 – Sheina Gokool
 – Vinatha Sreeramkumar
 – Lavanya Kunalingam
 – Varsha Ramrattan
 – Sharmila Singh
 – Komal Gandhi
 – Raivatie Usha Sooknanan
 – Ruchi Vohra
 – Lizann Lourdes Afonso
 – Deana Uppal 
 – Chandal Kaur
Virgin Island – Monica Vaswani

References

External links
http://www.worldwidepageants.com/

2012 beauty pageants